A video renderer is software that processes a video file and sends it sequentially to the video display controller card for display on a computer screen.  An example of a video renderer, is the VMR-7 that was used by Microsoft's DirectShow. An example of a UNIX video renderer is the one container within GStreamer.

The most commonly used video renderers are:
 Enhanced Video Renderer
 VMR9 Renderless
 Haali's Video Renderer
 Madvr Video Renderer

See also
 Rendering (computer graphics)

Notes

Graphics software